Acromis is a genus of beetles belonging to the family Chrysomelidae. The three species of this genus are found in Southern America. These species exhibit subsociality, where the females lay clusters of eggs that she guards until they hatch, the larvae mature, pupate, and young adults disperse.

Species:

Acromis sparsa 
Acromis spinifex 
Acromis venosa

References

Cassidinae
Chrysomelidae genera
Taxa named by Louis Alexandre Auguste Chevrolat